Surattha amselella is a moth in the family Crambidae. It was described by Stanisław Błeszyński in 1965. It is found in Afghanistan.

References

Ancylolomiini
Moths described in 1965